Chained is a Canadian thriller drama film, directed by Titus Heckel and released in 2020. The film stars Marlon Kazadi as Taylor, a Black Canadian teenage boy subjected to abuse by his father Pete (Adrian Holmes); he meets and befriends Jim (Aleks Paunovic), a criminal who has been left chained up in an abandoned warehouse, only to begin turning into an abuser himself as he learns the power of using violence to get what he wants.

The film was produced in British Columbia in fall 2019, with shooting taking place in Kelowna and at the abandoned Kaleden hotel in Kaleden.

The film premiered at the 2020 Vancouver International Film Festival. It was included in the festival's online streaming platform, but was also one of the few films at the festival given a socially distanced physical screening at the VIFF Centre.

The film received six Vancouver Film Critics Circle award nominations at the Vancouver Film Critics Circle Awards 2020, for Best Actor in a Canadian Film (Kazadi), Best Supporting Actor in a Canadian Film (2: Holmes, Paunovic), Best Screenplay for a Canadian Film (Heckel), Best British Columbia Film and One to Watch (Heckel).

References

External links

 

2020 films
Canadian thriller drama films
Black Canadian films
English-language Canadian films
Films shot in British Columbia
2020 thriller drama films
2020s English-language films
2020s Canadian films